Sweethearts of Country Music is a compilation album by American country artists Wynn Stewart and Jan Howard. It was released in 1960 via Challenge Records and was produced by Joe Johnson. It was the debut album releases for both music artists and their only album releases for the Challenge label. A combination of solo and duet recordings by both artists are featured on the package.

Background, content and release
Sweethearts of Country Music was compilation that featured a collection of songs Stewart and Howard had recorded for the Challenge label. By the release of this album, Stewart and Howard were both newly established artists that were recording on the west coast of the United States. This songs were recorded in a several year span and were packaged on this compilation for their first album release. The songs were produced by Joe Johnson.

The songs were recorded in the Bakersfield sound style of country music. Sweethearts of Country Music featured songs that recorded as duets by Stewart and Howard. This included their debut single release: "Yankee Go Gome." The pair's one charting single, "Wrong Company," was not featured on the album. It would later be released on a compilation in 2004.

Six additional sides are solo cuts by Stewart. This included his top five country hit, "Wishful Thinking." Four solo cuts by Howard also included. The first being her major hit, "The One You Slip Around With." Many of the album's songs were written by Harlan Howard, the then-husband of Jan Howard. Other songs featured writing credits from Stewart himself. Stewart wrote three songs that were included on the album.

Sweethearts of Country Music was released in 1960 via Challenge Records. It was the pair's debut albums in their careers and their only album releases for Challenge. The record was issued as a vinyl LP, containing six songs on each side of the record. The record did not reach any chart positions on Billboard upon its release. This included the Top Country Albums chart.

Track listing

Personnel
All credits are adapted from the liner notes of Sweethearts of Country Music.

 Jan Howard – lead vocals
 Joe Johnson – producer
 Wynn Stewart – lead vocals

Release history

References

1960 albums
Challenge Records (1950s) albums
Jan Howard albums
Wynn Stewart albums